Joscha Remus is a German author. Remus comes from a bukovinish-Moselle Franconian family. He studied biology, German and philosophy in Trier and Berlin.
After traveling abroad and then working on a medical journal, he trained in Berlin, Rome and London where he worked as a children's physiotherapist developing methods of "motor intelligence".

In the nineties Joscha Remus began publishing books, travel guides, and prose. It was during a training program for sound engineering at Thorolf Dormer in Berlin that he decided to create a travel audio book series. Since 2006 he has traveled extensively and written and produced several books in an Audio Travel Feature format for the Headroom publishing company in Cologne. In 2010 his series of travel audio books won the German Book Award.

In addition to his work as an author, Joscha Remus works as a science and travel journalist. In 2007 he founded the first knowledge cafe in Germany at the Stuttgart Mediothek (a part of Stuttgart City Library). Joscha Remus lives "on travel" with resting-points in Berlin and Istanbul (European summer)- and Australia and New Zealand (European winter).

Works 

Books
 Der Lichtertanz am Mauerpark.Lesereise Berlin (A travel to Berlin). Vienna: Picus, 2013
 Gebrauchsanweisung Neuseeland. (Manual Guide to New Zealand). Munich, Piper 2012
 Der Sternenwind am Bosporus. (Starwind on Bosporus). Vienna: Picus, 2010
 Der Kuss der langen weissen Wolke. (The kiss of the long white cloud). Vienna: Picus, 2009
 Kulturschock Rumänien. (Romania Culture Shock). Bielefeld: Travel Know-how, 2006
 Der sanfte Flug der schwarzen Damen. (The Smooth Flight of the Black Ladies). Romanian Rhapsodies. Vienna: Picus, 2008
 Infonautik – Wege durch den Wissensdschungel. (Nautical Info – Paths Through the Knowledge Jungle). Offenbach: Gabal, 2005
 Rumänien und Republik Moldau. (Romania and Republic of Moldova). Bielefeld: Reise Know-How, 2010, 3rd completely updated edition
 Lëtzebuergesch. 2005, 3rd completely updated edition
 City Trip Luxemburg. Bielefeld: Travel Know-how, 2010
 City Trip Trier. Bielefeld: Travel Know-how, 2012

Children's books

 Berlin – Guide for Children. (English Edition) Vienna: Picus, 2009

Audio Books

Die Maori. Science Feature, Cologne: Headroom Sound Production, 2012
Morocco. Cologne: Headroom Sound Production, 2008
Shanghai. Cologne: Headroom Sound Production, 2008
Ireland. Cologne: Headroom Sound Production, 2009
San Francisco. Cologne: Headroom Sound Production, 2009
Istanbul. Cologne: Headroom Sound Production, 2010

Short stories

  The transformation of Sap. In: Iwwer borders, over frontiers Sans Frontières. Luxemburg : Editions Guy Binsfeld, 2007

Newspaper articles
 In the Junk Shop of the Imagination. ZEIT WISSEN, Nr. 2, 2005
 Braces are also Intelligent. ZEIT WISSEN, Nr. 2, 2005
 Stanislaw Lem. Visionary without illusions. DIE ZEIT, Nr. 31 2005

Awards 

 2008: Prize of the Romanian Cultural Institute, Bucharest
 2009: German Audio Book Award (Nomination)
 2010: German Audio Book Award

Sources 

The information found on this page is the English version of the original German language version found here.

External links 
 Literature by and about Joscha Remus in the catalog of the German National Library
 Homepage
 Knowledge Café
 Romanian Photo Album

1958 births
German journalists
German male journalists
Photographers from Rhineland-Palatinate
Living people
German male writers
People from Bitburg-Prüm